Peter Price (26 February 1932 – 23 October 2015) was a Scottish professional footballer, who played as a centre forward.

Career
Born in Tarbolton, Price began his career in junior football with Craigmark Burntonians, before turning professional in 1951 with St Mirren. After a spell in English non-league football with Gloucester City, Price returned to league football with Darlington, before playing in Scotland with Ayr United, Raith Rovers and Albion Rovers. Price later played in Australia for Gladesville.

References

External links
 

1932 births
2015 deaths
Scottish footballers
Craigmark Burntonians F.C. players
St Mirren F.C. players
Gloucester City A.F.C. players
Darlington F.C. players
Ayr United F.C. players
Raith Rovers F.C. players
Albion Rovers F.C. players
Scottish Football League players
English Football League players
Association football forwards